The Women's 400 metres hurdles event at the 2013 European Athletics U23 Championships was held in Tampere, Finland, at Ratina Stadium on 12 and 13 July.

Medalists

Results

Final
13 July 2013

Heats
Qualified: First 2 in each heat (Q) and 2 best performers (q) advance to the Final

Summary

Details

Heat 1
12 July 2013 / 17:00

Heat 2
12 July 2013 / 17:08

Heat 3
12 July 2013 / 17:16

Participation
According to an unofficial count, 18 athletes from 13 countries participated in the event.

References

400 metres hurdles
400 metres hurdles at the European Athletics U23 Championships